Aruba is an island in the south of the Caribbean in the Caribbean Sea. It is westernmost island of the ABC Islands and of the Leeward Antilles. It is located 25 km north of the coast of Venezuela and 68 km northwest of Curaçao.

Politically, Aruba is a constituent country of the Kingdom of the Netherlands. Oranjestad is the largest settlement with a population of 32,748.

Geography

Geology 

Aruba is situated on the Caribbean Tectonic Plate. Aruba, as well as the rest of the ABC islands and also Trinidad and Tobago, lies on the continental shelf of South America, and is thus geologically considered to lie entirely in South America.

The core of the island is made up of Turonian submarine and subaerial basalts which were formed in the Caribbean large igneous province. These basalts were intruded by a pluton shortly after their eruption. The shore areas are mainly limestone.

Mountains and hills

Aruba is almost entirely flat. The two most known rock formations are Ayo Rock Formations and Casibari, both are tourist attractions.

Along the northern coast it is more hilly, especially in the Arikok National Park. While the Hooiberg is not the highest point on the island, it does look so, because of the flat surroundings it lies in. The Hooiberg can be seen from nearly every point of the island and is so known it has its on place on the Coat of arms of Aruba.

Coast and beaches
While Aruba's northern coast is rocky and mostly formed by corral plateaus with many small sandy bay like openings called 'Bocas', Papiamento for mouths. The sea is rough and dark blue compared with the southern coastal areas and swimming here is discouraged.

Climate
Aruba has a hot semi-arid climate (Köppen BSh) and nearly constant temperatures throughout the year.

The rainy season occurs between September and January, but exhibits very high variability due to the powerful influence of the Southern Oscillation.

Environmental policies 
In 2016, in response to a ban of plastic bags by the government, the Minister of Finance, Economic Affair and Culture, Xiomara Ruiz-Maduro, called for further increases to Aruba's environmental initiatives. She cited the fact that no environmental protection law had yet been passed in the territory.

Human geography 

The island is divided into eight regions:
 Noord/Tanki Leendert
 Oranjestad West
 Oranjestad Oost
 Paradera
 Santa Cruz
 Savaneta
 San Nicolas Noord
 San Nicolas Zuid

References

External links

  
 Map of Aruba
 Maps of Aruba (including island map, and detail maps of Oranjestad and San Nicolas)

 
Islands of the Netherlands Antilles
Leeward Islands (Caribbean)